Aliyah is a 2012 French drama film directed by .

Plot
Alex, a 27-year-old Jewish drug dealer who lives in Paris, plans to do his Aliyah and move to Israel for the chance of a better life. His brother, Isaac, keeps pestering him for money. During the course of a Shabbat dinner at their aunt's house, we learn they lack parental support. Alex's desire to move to Israel is not so much grown out of Zionism, but because nothing holds him back in France, in spite of his recent encounter with a gentile girl, Jeanne. The final scene highlights Israel's multicultural culture.

Cast
 Pio Marmaï as Alex Raphaelson
 Cédric Kahn as Isaac Raphaelson
 Adèle Haenel as Jeanne
 Guillaume Gouix as Mathias
 Sarah Lepicard as Esther
 David Geselson as Nathan
 Olivier Desautel as Polo
 Jean-Marie Winling as The father
 Mar Sodupe as Anaëlle
 Aimé Vaucher as Gabriel
 Bertrand Constant as Claude
 Marion Picard as Rébecca
 Brigitte Jaques-Wajeman as The aunt
 Louise Roch as Lucie
 Zohar Wexler as Nadav
 Michaël Abiteboul as The shaliah

Reception
The film was screened in the Directors' Fortnight section at the 2012 Cannes Film Festival. It was also shown at the 2012 Haifa International Film Festival and the Cabourg Film Festival.

Variety reviewed the film favorably, suggesting the cast was "solid." and that the film deserve a "wider audience" than "Francophone arthouses and Jewish fests". For Les Echos, it is "the best French film in a long time", as it shows many social classes in Paris, and admits the fact that Paris, as pretty as it is, has nothing left to offer.

References

External links
 

2012 films
2012 drama films
Films about Jews and Judaism
French drama films
2010s French-language films
2010s French films